Stefan Edberg and Anders Järryd were the defending champions, but they did not participate as a team, Edberg reached the final with Niclas Kroon.

Patrick Baur and Udo Riglewski won the title, defeating Stefan Edberg and Niclas Kroon, 6–7, 6–3, 7–6 in the final.

Seeds
Champion seeds are indicated in bold text while text in italics indicates the round in which those seeds were eliminated.

Draw

Finals

Top half

Bottom half

References

Men's Doubles